Acoustic In Nashville – Bootleg No. 2 is the second live album by Denver-based rock band the Fray, available on iTunes as well as at some indie stores.  It was recorded live in Nashville, Tennessee, in mid-December 2006, and released on September 4, 2007. It features never-before-released acoustic versions of "Look After You", "She Is", "Vienna", "How To Save A Life" and "Heaven Forbid".

Track listing

Personnel
Isaac Slade - Piano/Vocals
Joe King - Guitar/Vocals
Dave Welsh - Guitar
Ben Wysocki - Drums
James Stofer - Bass
Kristin Wilkinson - Viola
David Angell - Violin
David Davidson - Violin
John Catchings - Cello
Strings arranged by Suzy Katayama

References

The Fray albums
2007 live albums
2007 EPs
Live EPs